{{Infobox rail line
| box_width     = auto
| name          = Duisburg-Ruhrort–Dortmund
| other_name    = Cologne-Minden Emscher Valley Railway
| native_name   = Köln-Mindener Emschertalbahn
| native_name_lang = de
| routenumber   = *447 (Duisburg-Ruhrort)
423 (Grafenbusch–Bottrop)
426 (Gelsenkirchen-Bickern–Dortmund)
| linenumber    = *2206 (Duisburg-Ruhrort–Gelsenkirchen-Bickern)
2260 (Duisburg-Neumühl–Grafenbusch)
2205 (Gelsenkirchen-Bickern–Wanne-Eickel)
2208 (Wanne-Eickel–Herne)
 (Herne–Castrop-Rauxel Süd)
2210 (Castrop-Rauxel Süd–Dortmund)
| linelength_km = 61
| gauge         = 
| electrification= 15 kV/16.7 Hz AC overhead catenary
| speed         =  (maximum)
| locale=North Rhine-Westphalia, Germany
| map        = {{Routemap|inline=1|title =no |footnote=Source: German railway atlas|map=
BS2+l\BS2+r~~ ~~ ~~Trunk line from Hamm
ABZg+r\STR~~ ~~ ~~Trunk line from Lünen
BHF\S+BHF~~23.0~~Dortmund Hbf
STR\ABZgl~~ ~~ ~~Line to Soest and to Ardey Railway to Iserlohn
STR\ABZgl~~ ~~ ~~S-Bahn line to Witten 
ABZgl\ABZgl+r~~ ~~ ~~Line to DO-Dorstfeld (low)  and (high) 
STR\ABZgl~~ ~~ ~~Trunk line to Bochum and Witten
STR\eHST~~20.6~~Dortmund Werkstätte
STRr\STR~~ ~~ ~~Trunk line to Dortmund-Mengede
exSTR+r\STR~~ ~~ ~~Former line from Dortmund freight yard
exDST\HST~~19.0~~Dortmund-Huckarde Nord
exABZgl\eKRZo~~ ~~ ~~Former line to Dortmund-Huckarde Süd
xKRZo\KRZo~~ ~~ ~~Herne–Dortmund-Dorstfeld line 
exABZql\eABZg+r~~ ~~ ~~Former line from Buschstraße junction
\ÜST~~17.8~~Dortmund-Rahm (crossover)~~(former junction)
\HST~~17.4~~Dortmund-Rahm
\BHF~~15.4~~Dortmund-Marten
\BUE~~12.x~~Westricher Straße LC
\HST~~12.7~~Dortmund-Lütgendortmund Nord
\eABZg+l~~ ~~ ~~planned S-Bahn line from Dortmund-Dorstfeld
\BUE~~11.0~~Merklinder Straße LC
\BHF~~10.8~~Dortmund-Bövinghausen
\BUE~~9.9~~Hellweg LC
\HST~~9.8~~Castrop-Rauxel-Merklinde
\BUE~~8.4~~Cottenburgstraße LC
\BUE~~7.5~~Dortmunder Straße LC
\BUE~~7.0~~Münster Straße LC
\HST~~7.0~~Castrop-Rauxel Süd~~(since 1955)
\eABZg+l~~ ~~ ~~former Erin colliery siding
\eBHF~~5.3~~Castrop-Rauxel Süd~~(old)
\ÜST~~5.3~~Castrop-Rauxel Süd~~(crossover, former junction)
\HST~~3.3~~Herne-Börnig
ABZ+lr\ABZgr~~100.8 2.4~~Herne Hot~~Trunk line from Dortmund 
eDST\eDST~~100.0 ~~Herne freight yard
S+BHF\S+BHF~~98.4 0.0~~Herne~~(formerly Herne CME)
KRZu\ABZgr~~ ~~ ~~Line to Recklinghausen 
STR\ABZgl~~ ~~ ~~Connecting line from Herne-Rottbruch
hSTRae\hSTRae~~ ~~ ~~A 43
KRZu\KRZu~~ ~~ ~~Gelsenkirchen-Bismarck–Bochum line
STR\ABZg+l~~ ~~ ~~Connecting line from Herne-Rottbruch
ABZg+r\ABZg+r~~ ~~ ~~Line from Recklinghausen
S+BHF\S+BHF~~~~Wanne-Eickel Hbf
eABZgr\STR~~ ~~ ~~Former line to Gelsenkirchen-Bismarck (until 1988)
STR\ABZgl~~1.5 ~~Wanne-Eickel Wst~~several former lines
xABZgl\KRZo~~ ~~ ~~Trunk line to Gelsenkirchen 
xKRZu\ABZgr~~ ~~ ~~Line to Gelsenkirchen-Bismarck
exSTR\KMW~~2.4 ~~Gelsenkirchen-Bickern~~(km change, formerly junction)
exKRWl\eKRWg+r~~2.5 ~~Bickern (Junction, old)
\BUE~~2.5 ~~Erdbrüggenstraße LC
\BUE~~3.2 ~~Hüllerstraße LC
\eBST~~4.3 ~~Bismarckstraße~~(Bk)
\BUE~~4.3 ~~Bismarckstraße LC
\BUE~~4.5 ~~Hüttweg LC
\eDST~~5.7 ~~Gelsenkirchen-Schalke~~(old, formerly Schalke CME)
\DST~~6.4 ~~Gelsenkirchen-Schalke
\SBRÜCKE~~6.8 ~~ ~~A 42
xABZq+r\eKRZu~~ ~~ ~~Former Gelsenkirchen-Bismarck–Essen Hbf line
xKRWgl\KRWg+r~~7.1 ~~Nordstern~~(junction)
exSTR\eBST~~7.9 ~~Nordstern~~(Bk)
exKRWl\eKRWg+r~~8.6 ~~Nordstern~~(junction, old)
\hKRZWae~~ ~~ ~~Rhine-Herne Canal, Emscher
\eHST~~9.7 ~~Gelsenkirchen-Horst Süd
\eBHF~~11.4 ~~Essen-Karnap~~(old)
\BST~~12.2 ~~Essen-Karnap~~(siding)
\eDST~~13.0 ~~Bottrop Süd depot
\DST~~15.7 ~~Bottrop Süd~~(formerly Bottrop CME)
\ABZgl~~ ~~ ~~Line to Gersched junction
\KRZu~~ ~~ ~~Bottrop freight yard–Gerschede junction line
\ABZg+r~~ ~~ ~~Line from Bottrop freight yard
\ABZg+l~~ ~~ ~~Line from Essen-Horl
ABZq+r\KRZu~~ ~~ ~~Bottrop Hbf–Essen-Dellwig Ost line
eDST\STR~~Bottrop Westf sand mine (siding)
STR\DST~~17.4 ~~Oberhausen-Osterfeld Süd Swo
HST\STR~~Bottrop-Vonderort
ÜST\STR~~18.5 ~~Hochstraße~~(crossover)
eABZgr\STR~~ ~~ ~~former line to Sterkrade KWE
BHF\DST~~20.3 0.0~~Oberhausen-Osterfeld Süd~~(formerly Osterfeld CME)
KRZu\KRZu~~ ~~ ~~Oberhausen-Osterfeld Nord–Oberhausen West line
KRWg+l\KRWgr~~20.9 ~~Oberhausen-Osterfeld Süd Ost
STR2\STR2+c3~~ ~~ ~~Line to Oberhausen West
STR+4+c1\STR+4~~ ~~ ~~Trunk line from Wesel
BHF\STR~~23.9 ~~Oberhausen-Sterkrade~~(formerly Sterkrade CME)
ABZgl\xABZglr~~22.1 1.7~~Grafenbusch~~(junction) line to Oberhausen Hbf
xABZgl\xKRZo~~ ~~ ~~Trunk line to Oberhausen Hbf
exhKRZWae\exhKRZWae~~ ~~ ~~Emscher
exSTR\exBST~~4.0~~Oberhausen Stadt~~(siding)
exTBHFu\xKRZu~~26.4 ~~Oberhausen-Buschhausen~~line to Wesel
exBST\exBST~~26.5 4.3~~Hindenburg~~(junction)
exSBRÜCKE\exSBRÜCKE~~ ~~ ~~A 3
exSTR\exBST~~4.7~~Zielkowski~~(siding)
exSTR\exBST~~5.1~~Kübel~~(siding)
exSTR\exBST~~5.4~~König-Brauerei~~(brewery, siding)
exKRZu\exABZg+r~~ ~~ ~~Former connecting line from Duisburg-Hamborn
exBS2l\exBS2r~~ ~~ ~~(grade-separated junction)
exBHF~~28.7 6.5~~Duisburg-Neumühl~~(recently a siding)
exDST~~30.4 ~~Duisburg-Meiderich Nord~~(recently a siding)
exABZgr~~ ~~ ~~Former line to Beeck
xKRZu~~ ~~ ~~Hohenbudberg–Beeck–Duisburg-Meiderich Süd line
xABZg+l~~ ~~ ~~Line from Duisburg-Meiderich Süd
eDST~~32.7 ~~Duisburg-Ruhrort Hafen (port) old
eABZgl~~ ~~ ~~Former line to Duisburg-Ruhrort port
KHSTxe~~34.2 ~~Duisburg-Ruhrort
exTRAJEKT~~Former Ruhrort-Homberg train ferry
exSTR~~ ~~ ~~Former line to Mönchengladbach}}
}}

The Duisburg-Ruhrort–Dortmund railway (also called the Cologne-Minden Emscher Valley Railway) was built by the Cologne-Minden Railway Company (Cöln-Mindener Eisenbahn-Gesellschaft, CME) in the area to the north of its original Ruhr line to improve connections to mines and factories in the northern Ruhr region, which is now in the German state of North Rhine-Westphalia.

The track at the time of the Deutsche Reichsbahn mostly consisted of at least two tracks; now two-track, single track and completely dismantled sections alternate. The section from Oberhausen-Sterkrade to Herne was electrified between 1963 and 1975.

History

For a long time the main focus of the CME was on regional routes in the Rhineland and Westphalia. With the migration of the coal mining industry north from the vicinity of the Ruhr to the Emscher, the area between the two rivers became more of interest to the CME.

The CME began the construction of two lines, starting from the stations of Herne and Wanne on its trunk line. These ultimately connected to form a continuous line from Duisburg-Ruhrort to Dortmund with a long section along the Emscher, leading to it be called the "Cologne-Minden Emscher Valley Railway" (Köln-Mindener Emschertalbahn).

Wanne–Herne

In 1866, the CME completed the rebuilding of the busy section between the stations of Pluto (called Wanne CME from 1869 and now called Wanne-Eickel Hauptbahnhof) and Herne CME (now called Herne station) with four tracks. It also had sidings, including to the Pluto colliery west of Wanne.

Wanne–Ruhrort

On the western section of the line, the CME established Wanne CME station in 1867, which soon became a railway junction. The first section to Schalke CME (now Gelsenkirchen-Schalke operations depot) was opened on 7 November 1871 for freight. Two years later, on 15 November 1873, this was followed by the second section from Osterfeld CME (now Oberhausen-Osterfeld Süd) station to Sterkrade CME (now Oberhausen-Sterkrade) station. The first passenger trains ran from Sterkrade CME, which had served passengers on the Arnhem-Oberhausen railway since 1856, to Wanne on 1 July 1874.

The last section from Ruhrort CME (now Duisburg-Ruhrort station) was opened on 1 July 1875, at first for freight and also for passengers from 15 October 1875.

Finally, on 1 December 1878, a direct connection was opened between Grafenbusch junction and Neumühl station so that freight trains could pass through Sterkrade without reversing.

Herne–Dortmund

The eastern section of the line had previously been used as siding to the Erin colliery. This ran at first from Herne CME station for several kilometres parallel to the CME’s original line. With the establishment of Castrop (Stadt) station on 1 December 1874, this siding was converted from a freight siding into a line for general traffic.

By the beginning of 1878, the CME had extended the line via Merklinde (now Dortmund Bövinghausen) and Marten CME (now Dortmund-Marten) to Huckarde CME (now Dortmund-Huckarde) to the area of Dortmund freight yard, where it connected back to the original CME line to Dortmund CME (now Dortmund Hauptbahnhof). Passenger trains ran between Herne CME and Dortmund CME from 1 April 1878.

 Operations

The section between Dortmund and Herne is not electrified and has sections of single track. Passenger services are mainly operated as Regionalbahn service RB 43 (Emschertal Bahn) from Dortmund to Dorsten.

The long section between Herne and Oberhausen-Sterkrade is now continuously electrified. Until Wanne-Eickel Central Station and from Nordstern junction it is continuously double-track and almost exclusively used by freight trains.

The Regionalbahn service RB 44 (Der Dorstener) from Oberhausen Central Station to Dorsten runs on a short section between Oberhausen-Osterfeld Süd and Grafenbusch junction, although strictly speaking, this is a remnant of the Bergisch-Märkische Emscher Valley Railway.

Current situation

From Oberhausen-Sterkrade station and from Grafenbusch junction to the former Duisburg-Ruhrort Hafen station, the line is now completely closed and dismantled. A pedestrian and cycle path (the Grüner Pfad'', "green path") has been built on the former track to the Landschaftspark Duisburg-Nord ("Duisburg North Landscape Park"). A commercial area is located on the site of the former Duisburg-Neumühl station.

It has long been planned that line S4 of the Rhine-Ruhr S-Bahn would be extended in tunnel from Dortmund-Lütgendortmund station to immediately south of Dortmund-Bövinghausen station and it would then take over passenger operations on the Duisburg-Ruhrort–Dortmund line (which would be electrified) from Bövinghausen to Herne and the Herne–Essen branch of the current line S2. The RB 43 service would then only run between Herne and Dorsten. The eastern section of the Duisburg-Ruhrort–Dortmund line between Dortmund-Bövinghausen and Dortmund Hauptbahnhof would be used by a new line of the Dortmund Stadtbahn. For a long time funds have been available for the construction of the line to Bövinghausen, however, the financing for the operation of the line is not guaranteed. The Emschertal Bahn service runs between Dortmund-Bövinghausen and Herne every hour, but the S2 would run between Herne and Essen every twenty minutes as an S-Bahn service, so the Verkehrsverbund Rhein-Ruhr would have to fund the increased services through savings in other areas. Upon taking office, the transport minister Oliver Wittke called for all such proposals to be re-evaluated. The project has been removed from the integrated transportation plan for North Rhine-Westphalia; a resubmission is possible from 2015.

Notes

External links 

 
 

Railway lines in North Rhine-Westphalia
Railway lines opened in 1866
1866 establishments in Prussia